Upshur County is a county located in the eastern part of the U.S. state of Texas. As of the 2020 census, the population was 40,892. The county seat is Gilmer. The county is named for Abel P. Upshur, who was U.S. Secretary of State during President John Tyler's administration.

Upshur County is part of the Longview, Texas Metropolitan Statistical Area, as well as the Longview–Marshall, TX Combined Statistical Area.

History 
Humans have inhabited what is now Upshur County since at least 10,000 years ago.  The Caddoan people lived in this area, but were driven out about 1750, probably due to losses from new infectious diseases carried chronically by Europeans.

Later, some Cherokee migrated to the area from their territories in the Southeast – Georgia and Alabama.  The Cherokee were driven out of here by European-American settlers in 1839, after having been removed from the Southeast.

The first European-American settler in Upshur County was probably Isaac Moody, who settled there in 1836. Upshur County was named for Abel Parker Upshur, Secretary of State under John Tyler.

Upshur County has the distinction of being the county that has the largest settlement in Texas organized by the Church of Jesus Christ of Latter-day Saints.  In 1904, the Latter-day Saint Southwestern States Mission organized a colony at Kelsey, Texas.

On March 21, 2022 Upshur County was hit by an EF-2 tornado with winds reported as high as 135 mph. Extensive damage was reported but no fatalities. This tornado was a part of the tornado outbreak of March 21-23, 2022.

Geography 

Major highways 
  U.S. Highway 80
  U.S. Highway 259
  U.S. Highway 271
  State Highway 154
  State Highway 155
  State Highway 300

Adjacent counties 
 Camp County (north)
 Morris County (northeast)
 Marion County (east)
 Harrison County (southeast)
 Gregg County (south)
 Smith County (southwest)
 Wood County (west)

Communities

Cities 

 Clarksville City (mostly in Gregg County)
 East Mountain (a small part of Gregg County)
 Gilmer (county seat)
 Gladewater (partly in Gregg County and Upshur County )
 Ore City
 Union Grove
 Warren City (mostly in Gregg County) Pritchett, Texas, Big Sandy, Texas, Bettie, Texas, and there are many other small communities in Upshur County.

Town 
 Big Sandy

Unincorporated communities 
 Coffeeville
 Diana
 Enoch
 Kelsey
 Rhonesboro
 Simpsonville

Demographics 

Note: the US Census treats Hispanic/Latino as an ethnic category. This table excludes Latinos from the racial categories and assigns them to a separate category. Hispanics/Latinos can be of any race.

As of the 2020 census, there were 40,892 people in the county. As of the census of 2000, 35,291 people, 13,290 households, and 10,033 families resided in the county. The population density was 60 people per square mile (23/km2). The 14,930 housing units averaged 25 per square mile (10/km2). The  racial makeup of the county was 85.70% White, 10.15% African American, 0.63% Native American, 0.18% Asian, 0.06% Pacific Islander, 2.10% from other races, and 1.17% from two or more races. About 3.95% of the population was Hispanic or Latino of any race.

Of the 13,290 households, 33.50% had children under the age of 18 living with them, 60.70% were married couples living together, 11.00% had a female householder with no husband present, and 24.50% were not families. About 21.80% of all households were made up of individuals, and 10.30% had someone living alone who was 65 years of age or older. The average household size was 2.62 and the average family size was 3.05.

In the county, the population was distributed as 27.00% under the age of 18, 8.00% from 18 to 24, 26.60% from 25 to 44, 24.10% from 45 to 64, and 14.30% who were 65 years of age or older. The median age was 38 years. For every 100 females, there were 95.50 males. For every 100 females age 18 and over, there were 91.10 males.

Males had a median income of $31,216 versus $20,528 for females. The per capita income for the county was $16,358. 14.90% of the population and 12.30% of families were below the poverty line. Out of the total population, 18.60% of those under the age of 18 and 14.00% of those 65 and older were living below the poverty line.

Politics 

Upshur County is represented in the Texas Senate by Republican Bryan Hughes, from Mineola.

Upshur County is represented in the Texas House of Representatives by Republican Jay Dean, from Longview.

Upshur County, along with Marion County, is the 115th Judicial District of Texas.  The presiding judge of the 115th Judicial District is Judge Dean Fowler.  He began his first term as District Judge on January 1, 2019 and was unopposed in his re-election, to that office, beginning January 1, 2023.  Prior to serving as judge of the 115th Judicial District, Fowler served for sixteen years as the Upshur County Judge, beginning January 1, 2003 until December 31, 2018.

Per the Texas Constitution of 1876, the chief administrative body of Upshur County is the five-member Upshur County Commissioners Court. The County Judge is elected separately. The county road maintenance is administrated by the County Road Administrator. This system was adopted in Upshur County in November 2002 and reaffirmed by two subsequent elections. The commissioners court oversees all of the Upshur County government's operations.

Upshur County Judge Todd Tefteller began his first term on January 1, 2019 and began his second term on January 1, 2023. He presides over the Upshur County Misdemeanor Criminal Docket, Probate, Civil, and Commissioners Courts. Commissioner Gene Dolle is in his first term and has served Precinct One since January 1, 2021. Commissioner Dustin Nicholson began his first term as Commissioner of Precinct Two on January 1, 2019.  Nicholson was elected to a second term beginning January 1, 2023.  Commissioner Michael Ashley is in his first term and has served Precinct Three since January 1, 2021.  Commissioner Jay Miller began his first term as Commissioner of Precinct Four on January 1, 2019.  He was elected to his second term beginning January 1, 2023.

Education 
These school districts serve Upshur County:
 Big Sandy ISD (partly in Wood County)
 Gilmer ISD
 Gladewater ISD (partly in Gregg County, partly in Upshur County)
 Harmony ISD (partly in Wood County)
 New Diana ISD (small portion in Harrison County)
 Ore City ISD (small portion in Marion counties)
 Union Grove ISD (Small Part in Gregg County)
 Union Hill ISD (mostly in Upshur County, partly in Wood County)

Media 
The main newspaper for Upshur County is The Gilmer Mirror.
The Gladewater Mirror has been published since 1949, first, as a daily newspaper and then became a weekly newspaper.

See also 
 National Register of Historic Places listings in Upshur County, Texas
 Recorded Texas Historic Landmarks in Upshur County

References

External links 
 
 Upshur County

 
Texas counties
1846 establishments in Texas
Longview metropolitan area, Texas
Populated places established in 1846